Lone Elm may refer to:

Lone Elm, Kansas
Lone Elm, Cooper County, Missouri
Lone Elm, Jasper County, Missouri